Common Bonds is a 1997 independent feature film directed by Antonio Manriquez. The movie's crew was composed of 40 teenagers from all over Los Angeles. Work on the movie began at Pacoima Middle School and took place over a two-year period. Film rights were sold to Encore Media and the film was later given a special screening at the Sundance Film Festival.

Plot
Common Bonds tells the story of K.C., a rebellious teenage girl serving time in community service at a senior citizens’ home. Though at first K.C. is distant and defiant, she gradually is pulled into the lives of the seniors. Together with Norman, an irrepressible septuagenarian, she exposes and thwarts a con man who preys on the unsuspecting residents. In the process Norman and K.C.’s lives are changed through their discovery of the common bonds of understanding and support that tie both generations together.

Cast
Kate McKinney as K.C.
Glenn Dickerson as Sheldon
Polly Hunt as Scooter
Charles Rome Smith as Norman

Reception
The Daily News of Los Angeles gave a positive review for Common Bonds, saying it "[dazzled] moviegoers" with the film's innovation.

References

External links 
 
Listing at Sundance.org

1997 films
1997 drama films
American independent films
Films shot in Los Angeles
Pacoima, Los Angeles
1997 independent films
1990s English-language films
1990s American films